The 2023 Clemson Tigers football team will represent Clemson University as a member of the Atlantic Coast Conference (ACC) during the 2023 NCAA Division I FBS football season. The Tigers are expected to be led by Dabo Swinney, in his 16th year as Clemson's head coach. On the field, the team is expected to be led by sophomore quarterback Cade Klubnik who was rated by Rivals.com as the No.  3 player in the 2022 college football recruiting class.

Clemson was ranked ninth by Rivals.com in the 2023 college football recruiting class. Notable players committing to Clemson in the 2023 class include defensive tackle Peter Woods and defensive lineman Vic Burley.

The Clemson football team plays its home games at Memorial Stadium in Clemson, South Carolina.

Offseason

Recruiting

Players leaving for NFL

Transfers

Players leaving

Preseason

Schedule
Clemson and the ACC announced the 2023 football schedule on January 30, 2023. The 2023 season will be the conference's first season since 2004, that its scheduling format just includes one division. The new format sets Clemson with three set conference opponents, while playing the remaining ten teams twice in an (home and away) in a four–year cycle. The Tigers three set conference opponents for the next four years is; Florida State, Georgia Tech, and NC State.

Source:

Game summaries

References

Clemson
Clemson Tigers football seasons
Clemson Tigers football